Isuka can refer to:

 Common crossbill, a bird (Japanese name)
 Guilty Gear Isuka, a computer game
 Isuca, a manga series by Osamu Takahashi
 Isuka, a character in the anime series Noein.